80a Squadriglia was an Italian fighter squadron founded in 1917 to serve in support of the Battles of the Isonzo in northern Italy. By war's end, it had been credited with 21 aerial victories without suffering any of its own personnel casualties.

History
80a Squadriglia of the Corpo Aeronautico Militare was founded in February 1917 at the Arcade, Italy Central Flying School. It was assigned to 1o Gruppo on 28 February, with a strength of five pilots and five aircraft. By 10 March 1917, it had bulked up to ten Nieuport 11s on strength.

On 15 March 1917, it flew its first combat sorties. The squadron's first combat victory was scored on 24 April 1917. Six days later, it began six months of operations from a base at Aiello del Friuli. It would be dislodged from there as a result of the Battle of Caporetto. On 27 October 1917, the squadron set fire to five aircraft it was forced to abandon, and evacuated to La Comina. It would eventually settle into Marcon on 10 November 1917.

The squadron would upgrade to Hanriot HD.1s in 1918. They would fight on until war's end. Their wartime record tallied 4,637 combat sorties, 167 aerial battles, and 21 accredited victories. They suffered no casualties.

Commanding officers
 Capitano Mario Gordesco: February 1917 - promoted out ca. 1 November 1917
 Capitano Raoul Da Barberino: ca. 1 November 1917 - ca. 7 November 1917 (injured)
 Tenente Guido Sambonet: ca. 7 November 1917
 Tenente Georgio Zoli: 6 February 1917 - 30 April 1917
 Capitano Umberto Gelmeti: 30 April 1917 - 7 June 1917
 Capitano Achille Pierro: 7 June 1917 through war's end

Duty stations
 Arcade Central Flying School: February 1917
 Santa Maria la Longa: ca. 28 February 1917
 Aiello: 30 April 1918
 La Comina: 27 October 1917
 Arcade: 1 November 1917
 Marcon: 10 November 1917

Notable members
Alvaro Leonardi scored all eight of his victories with the squadron. Other aces who served in the squadron and scored victories included Michele Allasia, Giovanni Ancillotto, and Ernesto Cabruna.

Aircraft
The actual colors of the squadron markings depended on an aircraft's basic color. However, the squadron insignia was typically a red star superimposed on a white circle within a black border.
 Nieuport 11
 Hanriot

Endnotes

References
 Franks, Norman; Guest, Russell; Alegi, Gregory.  Above the War Fronts: The British Two-seater Bomber Pilot and Observer Aces, the British Two-seater Fighter Observer Aces, and the Belgian, Italian, Austro-Hungarian and Russian Fighter Aces, 1914–1918: Volume 4 of Fighting Airmen of WWI Series: Volume 4 of Air Aces of WWI. Grub Street, 1997. , .

Italian Air Force
Military units and formations of Italy in World War I
Military units and formations established in 1917
1917 establishments in Italy